Danville School District is a public school district based in Danville, Arkansas, United States. The district encompasses  of land, and serves early childhood, elementary and secondary education to a section of Yell County, including Danville and a portion of Corinth.

Schools
 Danville High School, located in Danville and serving more than 250 students in grades 9 through 12.
 Danville Middle School, located in Danville and serving more than 150 students in grades 6 through 8.
 S. C. Tucker Elementary School, located in Danville and serving more than 450 students in pre-kindergarten through grade 5.

References

External links
 

School districts in Arkansas
Education in Yell County, Arkansas